Judge and the Forest (translit. Sledovatelyat i gorata) is a 1975 Bulgarian drama film directed by Rangel Vulchanov. It was entered into the 26th Berlin International Film Festival.

Cast
 Lyubomir Bachvarov as Sledovatelyat Nikolov
 Sonya Bozhkova as Elena
 Alexander Pritup as Mihaylov
 Georgi Kishkilov as Sledovatelyat Naydenov
 Penka Tsitselkova as Studentkata
 Tzvetana Golanova as S.N.Popova
 Georgi Rusev as Stoyan
 Dimitar Angelov as Prokopiev
 Dimiter Milushev as Bonev
 Emil Dzamdzijew as Mladezhat na garata

References

External links

1975 films
Bulgarian drama films
1970s Bulgarian-language films
1975 drama films
Films directed by Rangel Vulchanov